Triple sec is an orange-flavoured liqueur that originated in France. It usually contains 20–40% alcohol by volume.

Triple sec is rarely consumed neat, but is used in preparing many mixed drinks such as margaritas, cosmopolitans, sidecars, Long Island iced teas, and mai tais.

Etymology 
The origin of the name "triple sec" is disputed. Many sources claim it comes from a triple distillation process used to create the liqueur, but others say that a triple distillation is not used. Several sources say that the term is a translation of the French sec, which can mean both "distilled" and "dry". Cointreau, a brand of triple sec, claims to have invented the term based on the three types of orange peels used in the liqueur.

History

Triple sec has been popular for more than 150 years. The Dutch East India Company created orange liqueurs by steeping dried orange peels from places such as the island of Curaçao. They called this "Curaçao liquor", and unlike triple secs, which contain only the flavor of orange peel, the Dutch version includes herbs and spices, and comes in a variety of colors such as clear, orange, or blue.

The Combier distillery claims that Jean-Baptiste Combier and his wife Josephine invented triple sec in 1834, in their kitchen in Saumur, France. Orange liqueur was rising in popularity after the Dutch introduced Curaçao, and the Combiers sought to create a version that would be true to the orange fruit, they wanted it to be crisp and clean, with orange essential oils as the main feature. To achieve this, the Combier family used bitter oranges that were native to Haiti, and sweet Valencia oranges to balance the flavor. The liqueur was made by sun-drying the various orange peels. After at least 48 hours, they would begin distilling this mixture in copper pots. Lastly, they would put them through a third distillation, to purify the flavor.

In 1875, Cointreau created its version of triple sec and calls itself one of the most popular brands. Triple sec gained popularity and was widely known by 1878; at the Exposition Universelle of 1878 in Paris, several distillers were offering "Curaço  triple sec", as well as "Curaço doux".

Production 
Triple sec is usually made from a spirit derived from sugar beet (used because of its neutral flavor) in which orange peel is steeped, the oranges having been harvested when their skin was still green and they had not fully ripened, so the essential oils remained in the skin rather than the flesh of the fruit. The spirit is redistilled and mixed with more neutral spirit, water, and powdered beet sugar resulting in the final liqueur. This process creates a spirit that has a very strong and distinct orange flavor.

See also 
 List of liqueurs

References

French liqueurs
Orange liqueurs